Thomas Robert Bugeaud, marquis de la Piconnerie, duc d'Isly (15 October 178410 June 1849) was a Marshal of France and Governor-General of Algeria.

Early life
He was born at Limoges, a member of a noble family of Périgord (Occitania), the youngest of thirteen children. He ran away from home, and for some years lived in the country as an agricultural worker. At the age of twenty he became a private soldier in the Vélites of the Imperial Guard, with which he took part in the Austerlitz campaign of the following year. Early in 1806, he was given a commission, and as a Second Lieutenant he served in the Jena and Eylau campaigns, winning his promotion to the rank of lieutenant at the Battle of Pultusk.

In 1808, he was in the first French corps to enter Spain, and was stationed in Madrid during the revolt of the Dos Mayo. At the Second Siege of Saragossa, he won further promotion to the rank of captain, and in 1809–1810 found opportunities for winning distinction under Suchet in the eastern theatre of the Peninsular War, in which he rose to the rank of major and the command of a full regiment. At the first restoration he was made a colonel, but he rejoined Napoleon during the Hundred Days, and under his old chief Suchet distinguished himself in the war in the Alps.

July monarchy
He spent the fifteen years after the fall of Napoleon without employment, returning to agriculture and developing his home district of Périgord. The July revolution of 1830 reopened his military career and after a short tenure of regimental command he was in 1831 promoted brigadier-general (maréchal de camp). In the same year, he was elected to the French parliament's lower house, the Chamber of Deputies, where he showed himself to be an inflexible opponent of democracy. In his military capacity, he was noted for his severity in suppressing riots. His conduct as gaoler of the Duchess of Berry led to a duel between Bugeaud and the deputy Dulong in which the latter was killed (1834); this affair, and the heavy handed suppression of a further riot, exposed Bugeaud to ceaseless attacks in the Chamber and in the press, though his opinion was sought by all parties in matters connected with agriculture and industrial development. He was re-elected in 1834, 1837, and 1839.

Algeria
Although he initially disapproved of the conquest of Algeria, his undeviating adherence to Louis Philippe brought him into agreement with the government. He embarked on a campaign to win the swift, complete, and lasting subjugation of Algeria. He was sent to Africa in a subordinate capacity and proceeded to initiate his war of flying columns. He won his first victory on 7 July 1836, made a brilliant campaign of six weeks' duration, and returned home with the rank of lieutenant-general. In the following year, he signed the Treaty of Tafna (30 May 1837), with Abd-el-Kader, an act which, though justified by the military and political situation, led to attacks upon him in the chamber, to the refutation of which Bugeaud devoted himself in 1839.

Finally, in 1840, he was nominated governor-general of Algeria, and early in 1841 he put into force his system of flying columns, a controversial but successful tactic known as "Razzia" at the time.  His swiftness and energy drove back the forces of Abd-el-Kader from place to place, while the devotion of the rank and file to "Père Bugeaud" enabled him to carry all before him in action. In 1842, he secured the French positions by undertaking the construction of roads. In 1843, Bugeaud was made marshal of France, and in this and the following year he continued his operations with unvarying success. His great victory of Isly on 14 August 1844 won him the title of duke.

In 1845, however, he had to take the field again in consequence of the disaster of Sidi Brahim (22 September 1845), and up to his final retirement from Algeria (July 1846) he was almost constantly employed in the field, by ordering in February 1846 to General Jean-François Gentil to organize the second campaign against the rebels of Kabylia. His resignation was due to differences with the home government on the question of the future government of the province. Amidst his other activities he had found time to study the agricultural characteristics of the conquered country, and under his régime the number of French colonists had grown from 17,000 to 100,000.

Later life
In 1848, Bugeaud was in Paris during the revolution, but his orders prevented him from acting effectively to suppress it. He was asked, but eventually refused, to be a candidate for the presidency in opposition to Louis Napoleon. His last public service was the command of the army of the Alps, formed in 1848–1849 to observe events in Italy. He died in Paris in 1849.

Bugeaud's writings were numerous, including his Œuvres militaires, collected by Weil (Paris, 1883), many official reports on Algeria and the war there, and some works on economics and political science. See: Comte d'Ideville, Le Maréchal Bugeaud (Paris, 1881–1882).

Bugeaud's innovations and writings continued to be influential among French military leaders engaged in colonial campaigns.

Streets
Streets and places have been given his name in the cities of  Brest, France, Albertville,  Auxerre,  Lyon, Marseille, Périgueux.  Attempts to change those street names have always failed up to now.

References

1784 births
1849 deaths
People from Limoges
Politicians from Nouvelle-Aquitaine
Orléanists
Party of Order politicians
Members of the 2nd Chamber of Deputies of the July Monarchy
Members of the 3rd Chamber of Deputies of the July Monarchy
Members of the 4th Chamber of Deputies of the July Monarchy
Members of the 5th Chamber of Deputies of the July Monarchy
Members of the 6th Chamber of Deputies of the July Monarchy
Members of the 7th Chamber of Deputies of the July Monarchy
Members of the 1848 Constituent Assembly
Members of the National Legislative Assembly of the French Second Republic
Governors general of Algeria
Marshals of France
French military personnel of the Napoleonic Wars
Grand Croix of the Légion d'honneur